The American Society of Comparative Law (ASCL), formerly the American Association for the Comparative Study of Law, is a learned society dedicated to the study of comparative law, foreign law, and private international law. It was founded in 1951, and was admitted to American Council of Learned Societies in 1995.  The ASCL is incorporated as a 501(c)(3) non-profit organization under the U.S. Internal Revenue Code.

The ASCL publishes the American Journal of Comparative Law on a quarterly basis. It was established at the University of Michigan Law School in 1952, where ASCL Vice President and first Editor-in-Chief Hessel E. Yntema was a professor. Yntema served as Editor-in-Chief until his death in 1966. The journal moved from Michigan to the University of California, Berkeley, in 1971, but returned in 2003. It is now being co-hosted by the Institute of Comparative Law (McGill University) and the Georgetown University Law Center. The Institute of Comparative Law's Director, Helge Dedek, and Georgetown University Law Center's Franz Werro, currently serve as Co-Editor-in-Chiefs.

See also

American Society of International Law

References

External links
American Society of Comparative Law

Organizations established in 1951
1951 establishments in the United States
Academic organizations based in the United States
Member organizations of the American Council of Learned Societies
University of Michigan Law School